Events from the year 1809 in Russia

Incumbents
 Monarch – Alexander I

Events

  
 
 Evangelical Lutheran Church of Finland
 Chekhov Gymnasium
 Battle of Ratan and Sävar
 Year 1809

Births

Deaths

References

1809 in Russia
Years of the 19th century in the Russian Empire